Frank K. Dunn (November 13, 1854 – August 8, 1940) was an American lawyer and judge, who was thrice elected to the Illinois Supreme Court, serving from 1907 to 1933.

Born in Mount Gilead, Ohio, Dunn received his bachelor's degree from Kenyon College in 1873 and his law degree from Harvard Law School in 1875. Dunn was admitted to the Ohio bar and then practiced law with his father who was a judge of the Ohio Courts of Common Pleas. In 1878, Dunn moved to Charleston, Illinois where he continued to practice law. In 1897, Dunn was elected an Illinois circuit court judge. From 1907 until his retirement in 1933, Dunn served on the Illinois Supreme Court. Dunn died at his home in Charleston, Illinois after a long illness.

References

1854 births
1940 deaths
People from Charleston, Illinois
People from Mount Gilead, Ohio
Kenyon College alumni
Harvard Law School alumni
Ohio lawyers
Illinois state court judges
Chief Justices of the Illinois Supreme Court
Justices of the Illinois Supreme Court